Balsall Common is a large village in the Metropolitan Borough of Solihull, West Midlands, England. The name “Balsall” comes from the Anglo Saxon word “Baelle” meaning corner (or angle) of land, and “Heale” meaning a sheltered place

Overview
The village is split between the civil parishes of Balsall, which also includes Balsall Street, Temple Balsall, and Fen End, and had a population of 7,458 according to the 2021 census. It also lies on the Heart of England Way.

The village is of recent origin; most of the houses and shops were built in the 20th century. Previously, the village consisted of a couple of hamlets of about six to twelve houses each and a few scattered cottages - as  shows. In the 1930s, there began the development which linked these isolated buildings, but it was not until after World War II that the village really began to grow.

Nevertheless, Balsall Common's secondary school is named the Heart of England School. The local primary school is Balsall Common Primary School.

It is served by Berkswell railway station (actually in Balsall Common) on the Coventry-Birmingham line, and by bus to Solihull service 88/88A. The station was formerly called Berkswell & Balsall Common. The High Speed 2 railway line is currently under construction on the edge of the village, and will include the  Balsall Common Viaduct.

Other nearby towns and villages include Knowle, Kenilworth, Warwick, Hampton in Arden, Berkswell, Barston, Honiley and Hatton. Its districts include Needler's End, Yew Tree, Catchems Corner, Balsall Street and Hallmeadow (developed in the 1990s).

Since the late-1990s, plans for a bypass, a large national supermarket and larger swathes of new housing have so far been circumvented. This is mainly due to Balsall Common being situated at the heart of the West Midlands green belt area known as the Meriden Gap, between Solihull and Coventry, and is thus subject to strict planning regulations. Therefore, the village has so far not witnessed rapid growth given its location, as residents had long-feared that the village would act as a population overspill centre for Coventry, Solihull and Birmingham.

References

External links

BalsallCom.Com - community website with forums run by local people.
A brief history of Balsall Common

Villages in the West Midlands (county)
Solihull